Iceland's first ambassador to Russia was Ólafur Egilsson in 1991. Iceland's current ambassador to Russia is Árni Þór Sigurðsson.

List of ambassadors

See also
Iceland–Russia relations
Foreign relations of Iceland
Ambassadors of Iceland

References
List of Icelandic representatives (Icelandic Foreign Ministry website) 

1991 establishments in Russia
Main
Russia
Iceland